Victoria (1898) is a novel by Knut Hamsun.

Overview
A miller's son, Johannes, falls in love with the daughter of a wealthy landowner, Victoria.  The novel follows them through adolescence, as Johannes struggles with the social hierarchy and becomes a successful author, and Victoria is forced into marrying Otto, a lieutenant, to save the troubled family economy.

A lyrical excursion into unconsummated love, love that is described memorably as Blood and Blossoms.

Hamsun later named his daughter "Victoria", after the novel.

Adaptations
 Victoria or Viktoriya, a 1917 Russian silent film directed by Olga Preobrazhenskaya
 Victoria, a 1935 German film directed by Carl Hoffmann
 Viktoria, a 1957 West German TV movie directed by Frank Lothar, starring Elisabeth Müller
 Victoria, a 1979 Swedish-German co-production directed by Bo Widerberg
  or Viktoriya, a 1988 Soviet film directed by Olgerts Dunkers
 Victoria, a 2013 Norwegian film directed by Torun Lian

References

Novels by Knut Hamsun
1898 Norwegian novels
Novels set in Norway
Norwegian novels adapted into films